Marie-Arlette Carlotti (born 21 January 1952 in Béziers) is a French politician and former Member of the European Parliament for the south-east of France. Educated at Paul Cézanne University in Marseille, France, she is a member of the Socialist Party, which is part of the Party of European Socialists, and sat on the European Parliament's Committee on Development. Since 16 May 2012, she is Vice-Minister of Disabled people in the Ayrault Cabinet.

She is also vice-chair of the ACP–EU Joint Parliamentary Assembly, and a substitute for the Committee on Foreign Affairs, the delegation for relations with the Maghreb countries and the Arab Maghreb Union, and the delegation to the Euro-Mediterranean Parliamentary Assembly.

Carlotti was one of six Members of the European Parliament participating in the European Union's observer mission in Togo for the October 2007 Togolese parliamentary election.

On 16 May 2012 she was appointed Junior Minister for the Disabled at the French Ministry of Social Affairs and Health by President François Hollande.

Career
 Specialised postgraduate diploma in law (1979)
 Specialised postgraduate diploma in human resource management (1986)
 Company executive in the aeronautical industry (since 1991)
 Member of the Socialist Party national executive and national secretary (1986-1994)
 national delegate (since 1998)
 Member of the Bouches-du-Rhône Departmental Council representing the Canton of Marseille-Les Cinq-Avenues(since 1988)
 Member of the European Parliament (1996-2009)
 Junior Minister for the Disabled in the government of Jean-Marc Ayrault (2012)
 Deputy for Bouches-du-Rhône's 5th constituency in the National Assembly

References

External links
 Official website (in French)
 Declaration of financial interests (in French; PDF file)

1952 births
Living people
People from Béziers
MEPs for South-East France 2004–2009
MEPs for France 1994–1999
MEPs for France 1999–2004
20th-century women MEPs for France
21st-century women MEPs for France
Socialist Party (France) MEPs
French people of Italian descent
Paul Cézanne University alumni
Women members of the National Assembly (France)
Deputies of the 14th National Assembly of the French Fifth Republic
French Senators of the Fifth Republic
Women government ministers of France
Women members of the Senate (France)